The Lowell Folk Festival is the longest-running, and second-largest, free folk festival in the United States. Only Seattle's Northwest Folklife is larger, both in attendance and number of performance stages. It is made up of three days of traditional music, dance, craft demonstrations, street parades, dance parties, and ethnic foods. All of this is presented on six outdoor stages throughout the city of Lowell, Massachusetts.

It is one of many festivals in the U.S. that originated from the National Folk Festival. Lowell hosted the event from 1987 to 1989, and the locals continued this festival starting in 1990. The festival is held from Friday through Sunday on the last full weekend of July each year, and is presented by Lowell National Historical Park, Lowell Festival Foundation, the National Council for the Traditional Arts, the City of Lowell, the Greater Merrimack Valley Convention and Visitors Bureau, and the Greater Lowell Chamber of Commerce.

In 2020, the COVID-19 pandemic caused the 34th festival to be cancelled. The 2021 festival was also cancelled, with the next festival being announced for July 29–31, 2022.

References

External links

1990 establishments in Massachusetts
Folk festivals in the United States
Music festivals established in 1990
Music festivals in Massachusetts
Tourist attractions in Lowell, Massachusetts